Zinc finger MYND domain-containing protein 11 is a protein that in humans is encoded by the ZMYND11 gene.

Function 

The protein encoded by this gene was first identified by its ability to bind the adenovirus E1A protein. The protein localizes to the nucleus. It functions as a transcriptional repressor, and expression of E1A inhibits this repression. Alternatively spliced transcript variants encoding different isoforms have been identified.

Interactions 

ZMYND11 has been shown to interact with:
 BMPR1A, 
 C11orf30,
 ETS2,  and
 TAB1.
 H3.3K36me3

References

Further reading